Alena Mikalajeŭna Anisim (née Amelčyc; born 28 September 1962) is a Belarusian opposition politician and linguist currently serving as a member of the House of Representatives of Belarus, the lower house of the National Assembly of Belarus. She is additionally the head of the Francišak Skaryna Belarusian Language Society.

Anisim was born on 28 September 1962 into a peasant family in the town of Stoŭbcy, Minsk Region.

In 1983, she graduated from the Faculty of Philology of Belarusian State University. She then worked as a nursery school and secondary school teacher. From 1991, she was a research associate in the Institute of Jacub Kolas Institute of Linguistics. Since 2017, she has been the chairperson of the Francišak Skaryna Belarusian Language Society. From 2017 to 2018, she actively promoted the creation of a Belarusian-language university in Minsk. However, the project was rejected by the Education Ministry.

In 2014, Anisim became a coordinator of the all-Belarusian Congress for Independence. That same year, the Belarusian congress of intellectuals nominated her for the presidency. However, having started a company, she abruptly withdrew from the race.

In 2016, she and Hanna Kanapatskaya were elected to the House of Representatives of Belarus, the first two opposition politicians to gain seats in twenty years.

In 2019, she announced her candidacy for President of Belarus.

Notes

References

External links 

1962 births
Living people
People from Stowbtsy District
Members of the House of Representatives of Belarus
Belarusian language activists
21st-century Belarusian women politicians
21st-century Belarusian politicians